Dioryctria abietella is a moth of the family Pyralidae. It is found in Europe.

The wingspan is 27–33 mm. The moth flies in one generation from the end of May to September.

The caterpillars feed on pine and other conifers.

Notes
The flight season refers to Belgium and the Netherlands. This may vary in other parts of the range.

References

External links
waarneming.nl 
 Lepidoptera of Belgium 
 Dioryctria abietella at UKMoths

abietella
Moths described in 1775
Moths of Europe
Taxa named by Michael Denis
Taxa named by Ignaz Schiffermüller